Muttart stop is a tram stop under construction in the Edmonton Light Rail Transit network in Edmonton, Alberta, Canada. It will serve the Valley Line, and is located adjacent to the Muttart Conservatory, south of 98 Avenue, in Cloverdale. The stop was scheduled to open in 2020; however, as of December 2022 the  Valley Line had not opened and no definite opening date had been announced.

Around the station
Muttart Conservatory
Cloverdale
Edmonton Folk Music Festival
Edmonton Ski Club

References

External links
TransEd Valley Line LRT

Edmonton Light Rail Transit stations
Railway stations under construction in Canada
Valley Line (Edmonton)